Florinus can refer to:

Florin, a coin
Florinus, presbyter at Rome, one of the Fathers of Christian Gnosticism
Florinus of Remüs, 9th-century saint
Henrik Florinus (1633–1705), Finnish priest, writer and translator